Parashanatha Temple is a Jain temple dedicated to Parasnath in Masarh village near Arrah in Bihar.

About temple 
It was built by Babu Shankar Lal of Arrah in 1819 CE,  a Inscription in the temple reads that this temple is dedicated to a citizen of Aramnagar (perhaps the old name of Arrah There are statues of 8 prominent Jain figures are in the temple along with seven dated Jain inscriptions. A 600 old Jain inscription in the temple of Parshvanatha has mentioned this place as Mahāsāra.

References

Jain temples in Bihar
19th-century Jain temples
Religious buildings and structures completed in 1819
1819 establishments in India
Tourist attractions in Bhojpur district, India